Ongart Pamonprasert (born June 12, 1994) simply known as Dom, is a Thai former professional footballer who played as a midfielder.

Honours

Clubs
Bangkok Glass
 Thai FA Cup (1): 2014

External links
 Profile at Goal
 O. Pamonprasert at Soccerway

1994 births
Living people
Ongart Pamonprasert
Ongart Pamonprasert
Association football midfielders
Ongart Pamonprasert
Ongart Pamonprasert